Civilization is a board game designed by Francis Tresham, published in the United Kingdom in 1980 by Hartland Trefoil (later by Gibsons Games), and in the United States in 1981 by Avalon Hill. The Civilization brand is now owned by Hasbro. It was out of print for many years, before Gibsons Games republished it in 2018. The game typically takes eight or more hours to play and is for two to seven players.

Civilization is widely considered to be one of the most influential games in the strategy genre, cited as foundational to both the grand strategy and 4X subgenres.

The game is also seen  the first game ever to incorporate a technology tree (or "tech tree"), a common feature in subsequent board and video games, which allows players to gain certain items and abilities only after particular other items are obtained.

Overview

The Civilization board depicts areas around the Mediterranean Sea. The board is divided into many regions. Each player plays a historic civilization and starts in the area where appropriate for that civilization, and attempts to grow and expand their empire over successive turns, trying to build the greatest civilization while minimizing the effects of calamities and war.

The goal of Civilization is to be first to advance to the final space on a table called the Archaeological Succession Table (AST). The AST starts at 8,000 B.C. and ends at 250 B.C. The AST contains fifteen spaces, and players are advanced on the AST each turn. At several points, however, certain conditions must be met (such as, the civilization must have a certain number of cities) in order to advance. Since any given civilization is unlikely to meet the advancement criteria at every stage of the AST, games usually last more than fifteen turns.

Civilization is unusual in that it does not focus on war and combat, as many games of its genre do. Instead, players are encouraged to trade and cooperate in order to advance. However, war and combat are entirely permissible, and are sometimes inevitable. In fact, the game is designed to limit players' geographical expansion possibilities, forcing them to deal with other civilizations militarily, diplomatically, or otherwise if they wish their own civilization to reach its full potential.

Gameplay

A game starts with each player having a single population token in the area based on the specific civilization represented (e.g. on the island of Crete for the Cretans or in Africa for the Egyptians).  As the first few turns progress, the population expands exponentially. Since any given area only supports so many population tokens, players need to spread out, eventually meeting the civilizations of other players. 

As each civilization grows, adding more and more population to the board, players can convert excess population into cities by gathering six population tokens in an area favoring settlement (or twelve in other areas). Each city grants a trade card to the owner, one of eleven commodities, such as iron, salt and grain. Having more cities gives access to more valuable commodities, such as bronze, spice and gold. Collecting more cards in a set gives a larger payout. For example, one salt is worth 3 points, two are worth 12 points, and three are worth 27 points. Thus, players are encouraged to trade with each other to collect sets of the same commodity. Along with trade come eight calamities such as volcanoes, famine and civil war, which destroy population and cities. Gains from trade are in turn used to purchase civilization cards, such as agriculture, coinage, philosophy and medicine, which grant special abilities and give bonuses toward future civilization card purchases.

Trade is the most important activity in Civilization. Trade cards give a player's civilization wealth, which ultimately helps their civilization advance on the AST. Many "trade sessions" can become quite vocal and exuberant as players try to out-trade one another. Since players are only required to tell the truth about one of the cards and the total points value they are trading, calamity cards can be slipped into a trade, thereby avoiding receiving the effects of the calamity.

The goal of the game is to advance (on the AST) through the Late Iron Age and become the most advanced civilization on the map board.  This is accomplished through clever game play and purchase of several high-value civilization cards.

Editions

Civilization by Hartland Trefoil (1980).

Civilization by Avalon Hill (1982): 1st edition with a cover depicting an antique Greek temple, an Egyptian fresco and some baskets; the board with the map is a one-piece multifold. 2nd edition with a cover showing three heads - a Roman legionnaire, a Greek man, and a Minoan woman above the Pyramids. The board consists of two separate pieces.

Civilization by Gibsons Games/Welt der Spiele/Piatnik (1988): English and German version. The cover shows six members from people around the Mediterranean Sea.

Civilisation by Descartes (1989): French version. The cover shows a grayhaired male, a Roman temple and the Pyramids in the background.

Civilisation by Gibsons (2018): UK version. The cover shows a Roman officer and an Egyptian noblewoman.

Expansions

Advanced Civilization (1991) 

The Advanced Civilization expansion contains simplified trading rules and gives every civilization the possibility to buy all civilization advances.  It also adds more trading cards, civilization advances, calamities and rules for up to eight players.  It contains all the cards available in the Trade Card Set (below).

Other expansions 
 Trade Card Set (1982): Usable with the Avalon Hill version. Adds additional commodities such as timber, silver and ivory to reduce the frequency of calamities, reduce the risk for a shortage in low value trade cards (which disproportionately hurts the players with the most cities), and increase the challenge of making large sets. Advanced Civilization includes this expansion.
 Western Extension Map (1988): Usable with the Hartland/Trefoil and the Avalon Hill version. Extends the game board west of Italy to cover Gaul, parts of the Iberian peninsula, the British Isles and northwest Africa. (Note that a version of this expansion was also available for the original Hartland Trefoil version of the game)
 Eastern Expansion Map (1995): Usable with the Hartland/Trefoil and the Avalon Hill version. Adds Persia, Sumer, Samita and Indus people and covers the areas of Persia, the westernmost parts of the Indian subcontinent and Arabia. The map has the imprint "Civilisation Eastern Extension Unofficial Version". It was published in Alea Magazine #21 (Spain). In addition there are five new civilization cards.

Adaptations
Incunabula was the first computer emulation of the board game by Avalon Hill (1984, for MS-DOS). Besides the main game, it included two shorter variants, one eliminating trade and one that includes only trade.

Avalon Hill's Advanced Civilization was a 1995 MS-DOS computer version of the board game, incorporating the Advanced Civilization expansion. The rules were slightly modified from the board game for computer play.

A projected sequel of the Civilization board game in the ages after antiquity drove the development of Age of Renaissance, published by Avalon Hill in 1996. This game, designed for 3 to 6 players, has kept only a few features of 'Civilization, such as commodities (no longer collectible cards but territories) and the civilization advances (no longer cards but ticks in a check list).

Civilization is also well-known as the core inspiration behind Sid Meier's computer game of the same name, which would itself act as the progenitor of the wider 4X genre.

Reception
In the February 1983 edition of Dragon magazine (Issue #70), Tony Watson thought the game was ground-breaking, saying, "Once in a while, a new game comes out that proves that there is still plenty of virgin territory out there for game designers to explore and plenty of room for innovative and imaginative approaches to those subjects. Avalon Hill's release, Civilization, is just such a game." He concluded, "Civilization is a game that defies comparison with others [...] It's a fine value and is highly recommended."

In the January 1990 edition  of Games International (Issue 12), Steve Jones examined the game at length and concluded, "Civilization is an excellent multi-player game for those who like long games which require considerable thought, concentration and decision making."

Civilization was chosen for inclusion in the 2007 book Hobby Games: The 100 Best. Steven Savile commented that designer Francis Tresham "created a thinking gamer's game, one that deserves to be played around a table with friends — especially the cheerfully scheming sort".

Reviews
 Casus Belli #44 (April 1988)
Games (Vol 6, No 4, issue #30, July/August 1982, review by R. Wayne Schmittberger)
1982 Games 100 in Games
Jeux & Stratégie #17

Awards
At the 1983 Origins Awards, Civilization was awarded the Charles S. Roberts Award for "Best Pre-20th Century Boardgame of 1982".

Legacy
The game shares the name and the basic broad themes of expansion, development and conflict with the MicroProse computer game Civilization by Sid Meier. The gameplay of the computer game is otherwise unrelated to Civilization, though MicroProse paid Avalon a licensing fee for the name. Later in 1998 MicroProse filed a lawsuit against Activision (who licensed the rights to the board game) and Avalon Hill to secure the rights for using the name. The lawsuit was settled amicably in 2000, with Avalon Hill selling all rights to the Civilization franchise to MicroProse.

Although the success of the Civilization computer games series has led to multiple board games, starting with Sid Meier's Civilization: The Boardgame in 2002, none of these games has any direct relation to the Civilization board game discussed here.

References

External links
 Product page at Gibsons Games
 

Avalon Hill games
Board games introduced in 1980
Fictional civilizations
Francis Tresham games
Board games about history
Origins Award winners
World conquest board games